GNU social (previously known as StatusNet and once known as Laconica) is a free and open source software microblogging server written in PHP that implements the OStatus standard for interoperation between installations. While offering functionality similar to Twitter, GNU social seeks to provide the potential for open, inter-service, and distributed communications between microblogging communities. Enterprises and individuals can install and control their own services and data.

GNU social has been deployed on hundreds of interoperating servers.

Features

Standard features 
 Publish updates via an XMPP/Jabber client
 OpenID provider and authentication
 Federation support via the OStatus protocol
 Subscriptions via PubSubHubbub
 Replies via the Salmon protocol
 Microformat semantic HTML of profiles and notices
 A Twitter-compatible API
 Categorization using hashtags
 Groups, using bangtags
 Localization and translations of UI (using Gettext)
 Automatic, self-hosted URL shortening
 Attachments (add files, images, video, audio to dents)
 Attached media files available in podcast format
 Embedding of content from other sites, like YouTube, Flickr, etc.

Available features 
 Webmention and Pingback communication with IndieWeb sites
 Geolocations and maps
 SMS updates and notifications
 Cross-posting to Twitter
 Live update of stream

History 

GNU social was spun out of the GNU FM project. The founder was Matt Lee and the early developers were fellow FSF employees, Donald Robertson and Deborah Nicholson.

StatusNet deployment based on the formerly known as Laconica was the Identi.ca open-microblogging service. Hosted by original StatusNet creators StatusNet Inc., Identi.ca offered free accounts to the public and serves as the co-flagship (along with freelish.us) for the installable version of StatusNet. The site has migrated to pump.io.

Version 0.9.0, released March 3, 2010, added support for OStatus, a new distributed update standard superseding OpenMicroBlogging.

June 8, 2013 it was announced StatusNet would be merged into the GNU social project, along with Free Social.

The service is interoperable with other OStatus platforms.

Names 
StatusNet was renamed from Laconica coinciding with the release of version 0.8.1 (a.k.a. "Second Guessing") of the StatusNet software.

StatusNet's name "simply reflects what our software does: send status updates into your social network."

Laconica's name was a reference to the Laconic phrase, a particularly concise or terse statement the likes of which are famously attributed to the leaders of Sparta (Laconia being the Greek region containing Sparta). In microblogging, all messages are forced to be very short due to the traditional ~140-character limit on message size. The GNU in the name refers to the GNU Project.

See also 

 Comparison of software and protocols for distributed social networking
 Comparison of microblogging services

References

External links 

 

Social software
Microblogging software
Web applications
Free software websites
Internet services supporting OpenID
Software using the GNU AGPL license
GNU Project software